The 174th (2/2nd London) Brigade was a formation of the Territorial Force of the British Army. It was assigned to the 58th (2/1st London) Division and served on the Western Front during the First World War. The brigade was formed as a 2nd Line of the 168th (1/2nd London) Brigade.

Formation
 2/5th Battalion, London Regiment
 2/6th Battalion, London Regiment (City of London Rifles)
 2/7th (City of London) Battalion, London Regiment
 2/8th Battalion, London Regiment (Post Office Rifles)
 198th Machine Gun Company, Machine Gun Corps
 174th Trench Mortar Battery

References

Infantry brigades of the British Army in World War I
Military units and formations in London